The 2013 Idaho State Bengals football team represented Idaho State University as a member of the Big Sky Conference during the 2013 NCAA Division I FCS football season. Led by third-year head coach Mike Kramer, the Bengals compiled an overall record of 3–9 with a mark of 1–7 in conference play, tying for 11th place in the Big Sky. Idaho State played their home games at Holt Arena in Pocatello, Idaho.

Schedule

Game summaries

Dixie State

Western State

@ Washington

@ UC Davis

North Dakota

Northern Colorado

@ Northern Arizona

@ Southern Utah

Eastern Washington

Portland State

@ BYU

Weber State

References

Idaho State
Idaho State Bengals football seasons
Idaho State Bengals football